An anthropophage  or anthropophagus (from , "human-eater", plural ) was a member of a mythical race of cannibals described first by Herodotus in his Histories as androphagi ("man-eaters"), and later by other authors, including the playwright William Shakespeare. The word first appears in English around 1552.

In popular culture, the anthropophagus is sometimes depicted as a being without a head, but instead have their faces on the torso. This may be a misinterpretation based on Shakespeare's writings in Othello, where the anthropophagi are mistaken to be described by the immediate following line, "and men whose heads do grow beneath their shoulders". In reality, the line actually refers to a separate, different race of mythical beings known as the Blemmyes, who are indeed said to have no head, and have their facial features on the chest.

Accounts 

People spell this creature's name in several different ways, 'anthropophagi' or 'anthropophage' being two examples.
Herodotus first wrote of androphagoi in his Histories, where he described them as one of several tribes near Scythia.  An extra note indicates that the androphagoi are cannibals, as reflected in their name:

Pliny the Elder later wrote in his Naturalis Historia that the same cannibals near Scythia wore the scalps of men on their chest.

Ammianus Marcellinus wrote in his Res Gestae a description of the Anthropophagi.

In literature 
It is likely that the ancient Greek account influenced later writers.  The most famous usage appears in William Shakespeare's Othello:

Shakespeare makes yet another reference to the cannibalist anthropophagus in the Merry Wives of Windsor:

T.H. White also features the Anthropophagi as Robin Hood's enemies in his novel The Sword in the Stone:

American novelist Rick Yancey incorporates the myths of the Anthropophagi in his 2010 release The Monstrumologist.

See also
Cannibalism
Blemmyes (legendary creatures)

References

External links
 Oxford English Dictionary

British folklore
Greek legendary creatures
Legendary creatures with absent body parts
Legendary tribes in Greco-Roman historiography
Mythic humanoids
Mythological anthropophages
Mythological cannibals